Chemung, elevation , is an unincorporated census-designated place in McHenry County, Illinois, United States. Per the 2020 census, the population was 276.

History
A post office called Chemung was established in 1845, and remained in operation until it was discontinued in 1943. The name Chemung is said to be a Native American word meaning "big horn" after a large horned fossil was discovered in a nearby river.

Geography 
The small, unincorporated town is located approximately 3.14 miles west of downtown Harvard, Illinois at the junction of Illinois Route 173, Oak Grove Road (County Highway A-20) and Island Road (the continuation of Oak Grove Road south of Route 173). The town straddles the boundary shared by Chemung Township and Dunham Township. In terms of geographic coordinates, Chemung is located at  (42.4152964, -88.6667668)  In terms of the Public Land Survey System, Chemung is found in Sections 4 and 5, Township 45 North, Range 5 East; and Sections 32 and 33, Township 46 North, Range 5 East of the Third Principal Meridian. Piscasaw Creek flows along the west side of Chemung in a generally northeast to southwest direction, and a freight branch line of the Union Pacific Railroad traverses the town in an east-northeast to west-southwest direction. Chemung is served by the Harvard post office.

Demographics

2020 census

See also
Chemung Township
Dunham Township

References 

Census-designated places in Illinois
Census-designated places in McHenry County, Illinois
Chicago metropolitan area